Jilarata is a  mountain in the Chilla-Kimsa Chata mountain range in the Andes of Bolivia. It is located in the La Paz Department, Ingavi Province, Desaguadero Municipality. Jilarata lies south of Wiñaymarka Lake, the southern branch of Lake Titicaca, near Desaguadero and the Peruvian border. Janq'u Jaqhi is northeast of it.

References 

Mountains of La Paz Department (Bolivia)